Samir Jouili is a Tunisian football manager and the current head coach of NC Magra.

References

Living people
Tunisian football managers
US Monastir (football) managers
EGS Gafsa managers
Najran SC managers
ES Hammam-Sousse managers
AS Djerba managers
Olympique Béja managers
EO Sidi Bouzid managers
US Ben Guerdane managers
US Tataouine managers
Tunisian expatriate football managers
Expatriate football managers in the United Arab Emirates
Tunisian expatriate sportspeople in the United Arab Emirates
Expatriate football managers in Saudi Arabia
Tunisian expatriate sportspeople in Saudi Arabia
Saudi Professional League managers
Saudi First Division League managers
1963 births